My Fair, My Dark is Ida's second EP, released in 2008 on Polyvinyl Records. It features two original songs, a live version of "Late Blues" (from Heart Like a River), and four covers. Guest musicians include The Band's Levon Helm, Peter Schickele, Michael Hurley, and Tara Jane O'Neil. My Fair, My Dark's eponymous lead song was first issued on the CD accompanying the 2005 music issue of The Believer magazine.

Reception

Reviewers highlighted the new song "Still Life" and the two on which Levon Helm participated, Dolly Parton's "The Pain of Loving You"  and the live version of Ida's own "Late Blues" from one of Helm's Midnight Ramble concerts. "My Fair, My Dark" was included on a list of "150 of the saddest songs in the world" published in the Los Angeles Times' music blog.

Track listing
All songs written by Ida, except as noted.

"My Fair, My Dark" – 3:15  written by David Schickele
"Don't Wreck It" – 3:48
"Road to Ruin" – 2:16  written by John Martyn
"The Pain of Loving You" – 2:49  written by Dolly Parton
"Late Blues (Live)" – 4:40
"Still Life" – 3:33
"Time Has Come" – 3:35  written by Anne Briggs

The vinyl release contains an additional cover, of Warren Defever's "Darkness Night".

Personnel 
Musicians
 Jean Cook – violin
 Levon Helm – mandolin on "The Pain of Loving You", drums on "Late Blues"
 Michael Hurley – viola on "The Pain of Loving You"
 Ruth Keating – drums, percussion, marimba, ukulele, shruti box
 Daniel Littleton – guitar, wurlitzer, piano, percussion, vocals
 Elizabeth Mitchell – harmonium, vocals
 Tara Jane ONeil – guitar on "The Pain of Loving You"
 Karla Schickele – wurlitzer, bass, vocals
 Peter Schickele – piano on "Late Blues"
 Lincoln Schleifer – bass on "Late Blues"
 Matt Sutton – pedal steel on "My Fair, My Dark"

Technical personnel
 Warren Defever and Ida – producers
 Justin Guip – engineering
 Sean Price – additional engineering
 Daniel Littleton – additional engineering
 Steve Fallone – mastering

Graphics
 Tara Jane ONeil – art
 Warren Defever – design

References 

2008 EPs
Ida (band) albums